Cornusymmoca is a moth genus in the family Autostichidae. It contains the species Cornusymmoca mongolica, which is found in Mongolia.

References

Symmocinae